Frank Edward Oberle Jr.  (born October 27, 1957) is a Canadian politician who was a member of the Legislative Assembly of Alberta representing the provincial constituency of Peace River as a Progressive Conservative, from 2004 to 2015.

Early life

Oberle was born in Ashcroft, British Columbia. He studied forest resource technology at the College of New Caledonia in Prince George in 1980. In 1988, he obtained a bachelor of science in forestry from the University of New Brunswick. Oberle won the Governor General's award (gold medal) in forestry, the highest university achievement in 1988.

Oberle worked for Daishowa-Marubeni International Ltd. from 1988 until his election in 2004, first as a management forester and, subsequently, as senior forestry advisor. He is a registered professional forester (RPF) with the College of Professional Foresters (CAPF).

Oberle's father, Frank Oberle Sr., served as the Member of Parliament for Prince George—Peace River from 1972 to 1993. Frank Oberle Sr. served as the Minister of State for Science and Technology and, later, the Minister of Forestry under Prime Minister Brian Mulroney.

Political career

Oberle was first elected as MLA for Peace River in the 2004 provincial election with 55 per cent of the vote. During his first term, he served as a member of the Agenda and Priorities Committee, the Standing Committee on Resources and Environment, the Cabinet Policy Committee on Resources and the Environment, and the Energy Council. Oberle also served as chief government whip and deputy chair of the Members Services Committee prior to his appointment to cabinet.

Oberle was elected to a second term representing the constituency of Peace River in the 2008 provincial election, receiving 65 per cent of the vote. He served as chief government whip. Oberle also served as the deputy chair of the Special Standing Committee on Members Services and was a member of the Privileges and Elections, Standing Orders and Printing Committee. He was Solicitor General and Minister of Public Security from 2010 to 2011, Minister of Sustainable Resource Development from 2011 to 2012, Minister of Aboriginal Relations from 2013 to 2014 and Minister of Energy from 2014 to 2015.

Oberle was defeated in the 2015 election, and Debbie Jabbour of the Alberta New Democratic Party became MLA for Peace River.

Personal life

Oberle lives with his wife Debbie in Peace River. The couple has two children, Kevin and Sadie. In his spare time, he enjoys fishing, woodworking, and river boating.

Election results

|}

|}

References

External links
 Frank Oberle's web page

Progressive Conservative Association of Alberta MLAs
Living people
1957 births
Members of the Executive Council of Alberta
Canadian foresters
21st-century Canadian politicians